Lakshmi Narayana or Lakshmi Narayan is the dual representation of the Hindu deities Vishnu, also known as Narayana, and his consort, Lakshmi, traditionally featured in their abode, Vaikuntha. The goddess of prosperity and beauty, Lakshmi, is depicted as standing next to Vishnu, who holds the Panchajanya, Kaumodaki, Padma, and the Sudarshana Chakra. Another depiction of Lakshmi-Narayana portrays Lakshmi in the service of Narayana, who reclines on the cosmic serpent Shesha, floating in the Kshira Sagara, the Ocean of Milk.

Legends 
The most significant Lakshmi-Narayana myth that appears in various Puranas is the Samudra Manthana, where Vishnu assumes his Kurma avatar to assist the devas and the asuras in the ordeal of churning the ocean of milk. Lakshmi emerges as one of the many treasures that are the product of the churning. The devas request Vishnu to marry her, and hence her auspiciousness is wed to his divinity, restoring the cosmic order.

In the Legend of Tirumala, the sage Bhrigu is selected to choose the deity to whom a yajna shall be dedicated towards. After rejecting Brahma, Indra, and Shiva, he arrives at Vaikuntha, where he observes Lakshmi massaging the feet of a resting Vishnu, reclining on Shesha. Angered by the perceived slight, Bhrigu kicks the chest of Vishnu with his foot. A calm Vishnu is concerned for the sage, and receives him with honour. Pleased, Bhrigu decides that the yajna should be offered to Vishnu. But Lakshmi is greatly enraged, the chest being the region of Vishnu most associated with her, and because her consort had not risen to the insult. She descends upon the earth as Padmavati, the daughter of a Chola king, and her consort assumes the form of Srinivasa, locating her and marrying her once more, hailed as the primary deity of Tirumala.

In literature, Lakshmi and Narayana are often offered epithets stemming from their relationship - Vishnu is hailed as Lakshmipati, the husband of Lakshmi, while Lakshmi is called Vishnupriya, the favourite of Vishnu, as well as Vaishnavi and Narayani, the greatest female devotee of Vishnu.

In the Prapanna Parijata, Lakshmi declares that the duality of her consort and herself represents Brahman:

Interpretations

The dual representation of the deities Lakshmi-Narayana has many historic roots, and is sometimes interpreted differently by different traditions. The goddess Lakshmi incarnates on earth with her beloved consort, following Narayana's wishes, and mode of incarnation. When Vishnu descended upon the world as Parashurama, the goddess incarnated herself as Dharani; when he was born as Prince Rama, Lakshmi appeared as Princess Sita; and when he was Krishna, she appeared as Radha or Rukmini. In Vishnu's next incarnation as Kalki that will spell the end of the present Kali Yuga, he will wed Padmavati, who will also be an incarnation of Lakshmi. This dual manifestation of the supreme deities of Vaishnavism is explored in the Ramayana, Mahabharata, Vishnu Purana, Bhagavata Purana, Brahma Vaivarta Purana, Skanda Purana, and in other scriptures. The Purushottama Mahatmya of Skanda Purana (13th century CE) and of Vishnurahasya (16th century CE) referred to the female wooden image between Jagannath and Balabhadra, Subhadra, as Lakshmi.

Traditions

Sri Sampradaya 

In the South Indian tradition of Sri Vaishnavism, the deity Narayana is worshipped as the supreme deity, and his consort Lakshmi as the supreme goddess. Lakshmi is regarded to be the source of salvation, Narayana, and is hence revered by adherents in order to reach God. The origin of the tradition's name is sometimes associated with the goddess herself, who is also called Sri. The devotees of this tradition primarily worship Lakshmi-Narayana as the ultimate duality, though they also revere their incarnations in the Dashavatara, including Sita-Rama and Rukmini-Krishna. The Urdhva Pundra, the sacred mark they wear on their bodies, is conceived to be a combination of the white feet of Vishnu, and the red streak in between represents Lakshmi.

Swaminarayan Sampradaya 
In the Vaishnava tradition of the Swaminarayan Sampradaya, a flute-bearing Krishna is worshipped with his consort Radha, and together the deity is referred as Radha Krishna, while Krishna in his four-hands form is identified with Narayana in the text Shikshapatri, and is worshipped with his consort, Lakshmi. The deity is referred as Lakshmi Narayana. The founder of the sect, Swaminarayan, installed the murtis of Radha Krishna and Lakshmi Narayana at the Shri Swaminarayan Mandir, Vadtal and Swaminarayan Mandir, Gadhada in Gujarat.

Worship 
Lakshmi Narayana worship is popular among Vaishnavas, who pray to the divine couple at their homes and in temples. There are many sampradayas (sects), that regard Lakshmi Narayana as the ultimate divinity, and grand and exquisite temples have been erected for their veneration. It is believed that worshipping Lakshmi Narayana can get for the devotees the complete blessings of the divine couple and shall bestow welfare, success, prosperity and a fulfilled life for the devotees and their families.

In Tamil tradition, Narayana is often represented with three aspects of Lakshmi: Sridevi, Bhudevi, and Niladevi.

Gallery

Temples 
 Golden Temple, Sripuram
 Lakshmi Narayan Temple, Agartala
 Laxminarayan Temple
 Divya Desam
 Sreevaraham Lakshmi Varaha Temple, Thiruvananthapuram

See also
Radha Krishna
Kalyanasundara
Somaskanda

References

Forms of Vishnu
Swaminarayan Sampradaya
Lakshmi
Hindu iconography